A Spanish Treasure is an album by pianist Tete Montoliu recorded in Japan in 1991 and released on the Concord Jazz label.

Reception

Scott Yanow of AllMusic states, "A fine bop-based stylist, Montoliu generally offers few surprises to listeners but always swings. This CD is a typical outing for the pianist, featuring ten jazz standards, fine backup work by bassist Rufus Reid and drummer Akira Tana".

Track listing
 "Israel" (John Carisi) – 5:10
 "Don't Blame Me" (Jimmy McHugh, Dorothy Fields) – 7:21
 "Tricrotism" (Oscar Pettiford) – 4:23
 "Misterioso" (Thelonious Monk) – 4:02
 "Our Delight" (Tadd Dameron) – 3:45
 "Like Someone in Love" (Jimmy Van Heusen, Johnny Burke) – 6:07
 "The Way You Look Tonight" (Jerome Kern, Fields) – 6:31
 "All of You" (Cole Porter) – 5:46
 "What's New?" (Bob Haggart, Burke) – 10:25
 "All Blues" (Miles Davis) – 5:45

Personnel
Tete Montoliu – piano
Rufus Reid – bass
Akira Tana – drums

References

Tete Montoliu albums
1992 albums
albums produced by Carl Jefferson
Concord Records albums